Enrique Bermúdez Varela (December 11, 1932 – February 16, 1991), known as Comandante 380, was a Nicaraguan soldier and rebel who founded and commanded the Nicaraguan Contras. In this capacity, he became a central global figure in one of the most prominent conflicts of the Cold War.

Bermúdez founded the largest Contra army in the war against Nicaragua's Marxist Sandinista government, which was supported by the Soviet Union and Cuba. From 1979 until the end of the military conflict in 1990, Bermudez was the Contras' top military commander. In addition to being responsible for all of the Contras' military operations, Bermúdez ultimately helped manage the Contras' transition to an opposition political party in the early 1990s after the second election in post-Somoza Nicaragua ended in defeat for the Sandinistas. The first election, held in 1984 with severe irregularities,  resulted in a victory for the Daniel Ortega and the Sandinistas; it was the rejection of this questionable outcome that led the Contras to continue their insurgency until Ortega and the Sandinistas were ultimately ejected from office.

On February 16, 1991, Bermudez was assassinated in Managua.

Early life
Bermúdez was born on December 11, 1932, in León, Nicaragua, the son of a mechanical engineer and a domestic servant.

Nicaraguan National Guard
After graduating from the military academy in 1952, he took a commission in the engineer corps of the Nicaraguan Guardia Nacional. He rose to the rank of Lieutenant Colonel under former Nicaraguan President Anastasio Somoza Debayle, and was serving as military attaché to the United States at the time of the 1979 Nicaraguan Revolution by the Sandinistas.

Contra war
Bermúdez moved almost immediately into armed opposition against the new government, ultimately becoming one of the most influential leaders in the armed opposition to the Sandinista government. Together with Ricardo Lau, he  created the 15th of September Legion, the first armed opposition movement against the Sandinistas. In 1981, Bermúdez returned to Tegucigalpa, Honduras, from exile in Miami. He later became commander of the Nicaraguan Democratic Force (FDN), the primary Contra movement.

During the Contra war, Bermúdez held the nom de guerre Comandante 380.

The Contras' guerrilla war against the Sandinista government became one of the most contentious and prominent Cold War conflicts, with the United States supporting the Contras through overt and covert military assistance, and the Soviet Union, Cuba, East Germany and other Eastern Bloc nations supporting the Sandinistas. Under the Reagan Doctrine, through which the U.S. believed it could drive the Soviet Union out of Central America and other regions around the world, the U.S. began supplying Bermúdez' Contras with arms and other support.

Criticisms
Assessments of Bermúdez's military and political leadership varied. His supporters believed that he provided stability among the fractious rebels, holding the FDN together while other Contra factions splintered. Critics, however, charged that he failed to provide strategic direction for the FDN's campaigns, and that he hampered the Contras' effectiveness by rewarding loyal cronies and ex-Guardsmen instead of the most able commanders. Discontent finally led to a council of field commanders ousting Bermúdez, as well as the purging of the Contras' predominantly Miami-based political leadership. Many of the members of the so-called Council were then suspects in his death, along with the Sandinista government.

Critics of the Contras also alleged that Bermúdez was one of several figures who had been engaged in cocaine and other drug-running as a Contra commander.

Relations with U.S.
Bermúdez, however, was the key military leader behind the Contras' war.  He also was a key contact for the Reagan administration, who saw him, along with Adolfo Calero, as their primary contacts within the Contra leadership.  Votes on U.S. aid to the Contras were some of the most contentious and close votes in the United States Congress during the 1980s, but the predominant sentiment in Congress was that continued aid to the Contras was critical both to establishing a non-communist government in Nicaragua and driving the Soviet Union from the American hemisphere during the height of the Cold War.

Autobiography: The Contras' Valley Forge
In the Summer 1988 issue of Policy Review magazine, Bermúdez told the most comprehensive account of his life, a lengthy autobiographical essay titled "The Contras' Valley Forge: How I View the Nicaraguan Crisis", in which the Contra leader chronicled his life from his early career as a military attaché to Somoza through the height of the conflict between the Contras and Sandinista government.

In the article, Bermúdez staunchly criticized the Sandinistas for their alliances with the Soviet Union and Cuba and for betraying promises they made to establish a representative democracy. However, Bermúdez also issued some criticism at U.S. policy, writing that some Democrats, such as Jim Wright, then the Speaker of the United States House of Representatives, were appeasing the Sandinista regime in ways that were inhibiting the Contras' in their effort to overthrow the Sandinista government. The article was authored by conservative author and writer (and then Policy Review editor) Michael Johns, who interviewed Bermúdez over a series of days in Tegucigalpa, Honduras in May and June 1988.

Assassinated in Managua
Following the Sandinista defeat in the 1990 elections, Bermúdez returned to Managua, only to be gunned down on February 16, 1991, after being lured to a meeting at Managua's InterContinental Hotel. He was shot in the hotel's parking lot as he departed the hotel after those with whom he was meeting failed to show. In 1994, Bermúdez' daughter, Claudia Bermúdez, told The Miami Herald: "There were a lot of people who would have benefited from having my dad put away--the Sandinistas, the Chamorro government, the United States. My dad died with a lot of information."

Personal
In the last years of the Contra War, Bermúdez had taken up reading the works of noted libertarian author Ayn Rand. While serving as commander of the semi-secret Contra headquarters on the Nicaragua-Honduras border code named "Aguacate" - Spanish for Avocado - he was known for taking solitary walks in the nearby jungle, taking photographs of intricate spiderwebs. Bermúdez is survived by family members, most of whom live in Miami. He was buried in Miami, following a funeral mass that was attended by many of his U.S. and Nicaraguan supporters.

In 2002 and 2004, his daughter, Claudia Bermúdez, now a resident of the San Francisco area, ran unsuccessfully against incumbent Democrat Barbara Lee for California's 9th congressional district seat. She remains heavily engaged in public policy-related initiatives in the district.

See also
 List of unsolved murders
 National Guard (Nicaragua)
 Nicaraguan Revolution
 Sandinista Popular Army

Notes

References
Enrique Bermúdez (with Michael Johns), "The Contras' Valley Forge: How I View the Nicaraguan Crisis," Policy Review, Heritage Foundation, Summer 1988..
Shirley Christian, Nicaragua: Revolution in the Family, Vintage, 1986, .
Glenn Garvin, Everybody Had His Own Gringo: The CIA and the Contras, Brassey's (US), 1992, .
Roy Gutman, Banana Diplomacy: The Making of American Policy in Nicaragua, 1981-1987, Simon & Schuster, 1988, .
"Shultz to Visit Central America on Faltering Talks" The New York Times, June 19, 1988 (covering Bermúdez' Summer 1988 autobiography in Policy Review).
United States Department of State, Special Report No. 174, Nicaraguan Biographies: A Resource Book, Bureau of Public Affairs, 1988.

External links
"Bermudez Elected a Contra Director", Associated Press, The New York Times, July 19, 1988
"Sandinista Says Colonel's Election Shows Contras' 'True Character'", The New York Times, July 22, 1988
"Quick Solution is Sought in Ex-Contra Chief's Death", Reuters, The New York Times, February 18, 1991
"Leader's Slaying Incites Ex-Contras," The New York Times, February 20, 1991.
"Nicaragua Holds Suspect in Killing of Contra Chief" The New York Times, March 6, 1991
"Nicaraguan Aide Says Killer of Ex-Contra Might Be Dead", Reuters, The New York Times, March 7, 1991].
"Assassins in Managua", The New York Times, April 16, 1991

1932 births
1990s murders in Nicaragua
1991 crimes in Nicaragua 
1991 deaths
1991 murders in North America
Assassinated military personnel
Assassinated Nicaraguan politicians
Contras
Deaths by firearm in Nicaragua
Male murder victims
Military attachés
Nicaraguan anti-communists
Nicaraguan expatriates in the United States
Nicaraguan military personnel
Nicaraguan revolutionaries
People from León, Nicaragua
People from Managua
People from Miami
People murdered in Nicaragua
People of the Cold War
People of the Nicaraguan Revolution
Unsolved murders in Nicaragua